Naugatuck station is a commuter rail station on the Waterbury Branch of the Metro-North Railroad's New Haven Line, located in Naugatuck, Connecticut.

History
Rail service in Naugatuck dates back to the 1840s with the establishment of the Naugatuck Railroad. The Naugatuck was acquired by the New York, New Haven and Hartford Railroad, which built a new station house between 1908 and 1910, and opened it in 1911. The old station was designed by Henry Bacon, one of America's foremost architects. This former station building was recently the headquarters for the Naugatuck Historical Society and is now The Station Restaurant.

Station layout
The station has one low-level side platform on the west side of the single track. It is owned and operated by the Connecticut Department of Transportation, but Metro-North is responsible for maintaining platform lighting as well as trash and snow removal. The station has 125 parking spaces operated by the borough of Naugatuck.

References

External links

Connecticut Department of Transportation "Condition Inspection for the Naugatuck Station" July 2002

Naugatuck, Connecticut
Stations along New York, New Haven and Hartford Railroad lines
Metro-North Railroad stations in Connecticut
Railroad stations in New Haven County, Connecticut
Transportation in New Haven County, Connecticut